CHOW-FM is a Canadian radio station, which broadcasts a community radio format branded as Radio Boréale on 105.3 FM in Amos, Quebec.

Licensed by the Canadian Radio-television and Telecommunications Commission in October 2007, the station was scheduled to launch in 2008, but it officially began broadcasting in 2009. CHOW is owned by Radio Boréale.

The callsign CHOW was previously used by a radio station in Welland, Ontario from 1957 to 2005, now known as CIXL-FM.

On October 29, 2009, CHOW received CRTC approval to increase transmitter power from 5,376 watts to 17,787 watts.

The station is a member of the Association des radiodiffuseurs communautaires du Québec.

Transmitters
On July 22, 2020, Radio Boreale submitted two applications to add two new FM transmitters to serve La Sarre at 106.1 MHz and Rouyn-Noranda at 104.9 MHz. These applications are pending approval by the CRTC. On December 5, 2022, Radio Boréale resubmitted applications to add new FM transmitters at 106.1 MHz in La Sarre  and 104.9 MHz in Rouyn-Noranda.

References

External links
Radio Boréale
 

Amos, Quebec
How
How
How
Radio stations established in 2007
2007 establishments in Quebec